The Business Standard is a Bangladeshi daily newspaper published in English and Bengali. The newspaper was founded by The Horizon Media and Publication Ltd and is based in Dhaka, the capital of Bangladesh. The newspaper provides detailed analysis of the economic and financial affairs of Bangladesh. The Business Standard also provides selective analysis from various publications including Bloomberg, Reuters, Foreign Policy, Project Syndicate and Hindustan Times.

References

Newspapers published in Bangladesh